Corrado may refer to:

Places
Anticoli Corrado, comune in the City of Rome
Monte Vidon Corrado, comune in the Province of Fermo

People

Given name
See Corrado (given name)

Surname
Andrea Corrado (1873-1963), Italian ship owner
Andrea Di Corrado (born 1988), Italian cyclist
A. J. Corrado (born 1992), American former soccer player
Carol Corrado, American economist
Frank Corrado (born 1993), Canadian ice hockey player
Giambono di Corrado (1400s), Italian painter
Gino Corrado (1893-1982), Italian actor
Kristin Corrado (born 1965), American politician
Niccolò Corrado (born 2000), Italian football player
Regina Corrado, American television writer
Sebastian Corrado (died 1556), Italian grammarian

Other
 Volkswagen Corrado, a Volkswagen sport compact car produced from 1988 until 1995
 Corrado (film), a film starring Johnny Messner and Tom Sizemore

See also
 Corado, a surname